Stockhaven is a rural locality in the North Burnett Region, Queensland, Australia.

References 

North Burnett Region
Localities in Queensland